Sweziella is a genus of flies belonging to the family Dolichopodidae, endemic to Hawaii. It is part of the Eurynogaster complex of genera.

Species
The genus includes the following species:
Sweziella aeruginosa 
Sweziella conspicua 
Sweziella emarginata 
Sweziella gracilipennata 
Sweziella pictilipennata 
Sweziella tergoprolixa 
Sweziella virida

References

Hydrophorinae
Dolichopodidae genera
Insects of Hawaii
Endemic fauna of Hawaii